Germantown is a passenger rail station on the MARC Brunswick Line between Washington, D.C. and Martinsburg, WV (with a branch to Frederick, MD). It is one of the busiest stations on the Brunswick Line along with Silver Spring and Rockville stations. All Brunswick Line trains stop at this station.

The original Germantown station, which was built by Ephraim Francis Baldwin for the Baltimore and Ohio Railroad was destroyed by arsonists in 1978, and was reconstructed for MARC.

Station layout

References

External links
 
 MARC station official website
 Germantown MARC station (Road and Rail Pictures)

Brunswick Line
Former Baltimore and Ohio Railroad stations
Railway stations in Montgomery County, Maryland
MARC Train stations